The Derwent Valley Heritage Way (DVHW) is a  waymarked footpath along the Derwent Valley through the Peak District (as far as Rowsley). The walk starts from Ladybower Reservoir in the Peak District National Park via Chatsworth, the scenery around the Derbyshire Dales, and through the Derwent Valley Mills World Heritage Site. It follows the Riverside Path through Derby and continues onwards to the historic inland port of Shardlow. Journey's end is at Derwent Mouth where the River Derwent flows into the River Trent.

The walk was established by The Derwent Valley Trust, which was set up in 1996. The route was planned and developed by Derbyshire Countryside Ranger, Rick Jillings. The Duke of Devonshire opened the walk at Chatsworth House in 2003.

Route 
Places on the route and highlights on or near the trail:

Ladybower Reservoir to Baslow 

Ladybower Reservoir: Heatherdene car park
Thornhill
 Mytham Bridge
 Shatton Bridge over the River Noe
 Leadmill Bridge
Hathersage
Grindleford
Froggatt: Froggatt Woods, Froggatt Bridge
Calver: Calver Bridge
 Bubnell

Baslow to Matlock 

Baslow
 Chatsworth Park: Chatsworth House
 Calton Lees
Rowsley
River Wye
 Caudwell's Mill
 Churchtown
Darley Bridge
Cawdor Quarry

Matlock to Belper 

Matlock: Hall Leys Park, Bentley Brook
Matlock Bath
 High Tor summit: Derwent Gorge
Heights of Abraham cable car
Masson Mill
Cromford: Pavilion, Arkwright’s Cromford Mill
Cromford Canal: High Peak Junction, Leawood Pump House
Whatstandwell
Ambergate: River Amber
 The Birches (Woodland Trust wood)
 North and East Mills

Belper to Derby 

Belper
 Coppice Brook
Makeney
 Duffield Bridge
 Peckwash Mill
 Rigga Quarry
Little Eaton
Darley Abbey: Darley Abbey Mills, toll bridge
Darley Park
 Derby Riverside Path at Handyside Bridge
Derby Silk Mill
 River Gardens

Derby to Derwent Mouth 

Derby: Pride Park, Alvaston Park
Elvaston Castle Country Park
Borrowash: Borrowash Bridge
Ambaston
Shardlow: Heritage Centre, Clock Warehouse
Trent and Mersey Canal
Derwent Mouth: Derwent Mouth Lock, River Trent

Access 
Train stations: Bamford, Hathersage, Rowsley South, Darley Dale, Matlock, Matlock Bath, Cromford, Whatstandwell, Ambergate, Belper, Duffield, Derby.

The route is covered by 4 OS Explorer maps:

 OL1 - The Peak District (Dark Peak)
 OL24 - The Peak District (White Peak)
 259 - Derby
 260 - Nottingham

Connected paths: Bonnie Prince Charlie Walk, Centenary Way (Derbyshire), High Peak Trail, Midshires Way.

The official guide book is 'The Derwent Valley Heritage Way' published by Bannister Publications, 2ed, 2014.

External links 
Official Site of the Derwent Valley Heritage Way
Derwent Valley Mills World Heritage Site

References 

Long-distance footpaths in England
Footpaths in Derbyshire
Peak District
Derbyshire Dales